Unión Deportiva Tamaraceite is a Spanish football team based in Las Palmas, in the autonomous community of Canary Islands. Founded in 1966, it plays in Segunda División RFEF – Group 4, holding home matches at Campo de Fútbol Juan Guedes, with a capacity of 2,000 seats.

History 
In the 2017–18 season the club won the Regional Preferente Canarias Division, Group 1 and promoted to the Tercera División.

Season to season

1 season in Segunda División B
1 season in Segunda División RFEF
5 seasons in Tercera División

Current squad

References

External links
ArefePedia team profile 
La Preferente profile 
Soccerway team profile

Football clubs in the Canary Islands
Sport in Gran Canaria
Association football clubs established in 1966
1966 establishments in Spain